Marcus Landry (born November 1, 1985) is an American professional basketball player who last played for Goyang Orions of the Korean Basketball League. Landry attended Vincent High School in Milwaukee, Wisconsin and played his college basketball at the University of Wisconsin from 2005 to 2009.

High school career
Landry attended Harold S. Vincent High School where he averaged 16.1 points, 5.9 rebounds and shot 59 percent from the field as a senior, leading his team to the Division I state title game and earning him a unanimous first-team all-state selection by the Associated Press.

College career
After graduating from high school, Landry attended the University of Wisconsin-Madison. He became the 33rd player in Wisconsin history to reach the 1,000-point plateau and finished his career 25th on the school's all-time scoring list with 1,114 career points and eighth in Badgers annals with 185 offensive rebounds. With 99 career blocked shots, Landry also finished fifth in Wisconsin history and was also the 18th player in the school's history with at least 1,000 points and 500 rebounds. Landry appeared in 105 straight games and started the final 75 games of his career, being part of 100 wins during his collegiate career. He had 45 career double-digit scoring games. Landry helped lead the Badgers to a 2008 Big Ten men's basketball tournament championship, being named Big Ten tournament Most Outstanding Player.

Professional career
After going undrafted in the 2009 NBA draft, Landry was signed by the New York Knicks in September 2009.

He was traded to the Boston Celtics along with Nate Robinson for Eddie House, Bill Walker, and J. R. Giddens on February 18, 2010. The Celtics assigned Landry to the Maine Red Claws on March 6, 2010.

In September 2010, he signed with the Sacramento Kings, joining his brother Carl. However, he was released on October 15. He was then acquired by the Kings' NBA D-League affiliate, the Reno Bighorns for the 2010–11 season.

In July 2011, he signed a one-year deal with BCM Gravelines in France. He was released soon afterwards and signed a 6-week contract with Bàsquet Manresa. On December 13, 2011, he signed with the Phoenix Suns but he was waived before the start of the 2011–12 season.

In July 2012, Landry signed with the Shanghai Sharks. In November 2012, he was acquired by the Reno Bighorns of the NBA Development League and represented them in the 2013 D-League Showcase Three Point Shootout, finishing in second place.

On February 4, 2013, Landry was named to the Futures All-Star roster for the 2013 NBA D-League All-Star Game. and on February 16, Landry won the NBA Developmental League Three Point Shootout. On March 12, it was announced that Landry had suffered a season ending knee injury and was placed on the inactive list.

Following a 2013 NBA Summer League stint, Landry was signed by the Los Angeles Lakers in September 2013, but was waived on October 25.

On December 16, 2013, Landry was re-acquired by the Reno Bighorns. On December 20, his contract was bought out by the Bighorns after just one game. On December 20, 2013, he signed with Cajasol Sevilla.

On August 2, 2014, Landry signed with CAI Zaragoza of the Liga ACB. In 34 league games for Zaragoza in 2014–15, he averaged 10.4 points, 3.8 rebounds and 1.3 assists per game.

On August 17, 2015, Landry signed with the Milwaukee Bucks. He was waived by the Bucks on October 21, 2015 after appearing in four preseason games. On December 20, he returned to the Liga ACB, this time with RETAbet.es GBC.

On August 3, 2016, Landry signed with Basket Brescia Leonessa of Italy for the 2016–17 season. Landry was named the Lega Basket Serie A MVP of the 2016–17 season, after averaging a league-high 19.6 points per game.

On September 19, 2019, Landry signed with Goyang Orions.

Personal life
Landry is the son of Mark and Anita and the younger brother of Carl Landry, who played in the NBA, and also has a younger sister Shenita Lasha, who is a professional basketball player. His wife Efueka played basketball at Marquette and has three children: a son, Marcus Jr., and two daughters, Mariah and Makaylah.

References

External links
Basketball-Reference.com Profile
Eurobasket.com Profile
Spanish League Profile 
Italian League Profile 

1985 births
Living people
African-American basketball players
American expatriate basketball people in China
American expatriate basketball people in Italy
American expatriate basketball people in South Korea
American expatriate basketball people in Spain
American expatriate basketball people in Venezuela
American men's basketball players
Baloncesto Superior Nacional players
Basketball players from Milwaukee
Basket Brescia Leonessa players
Basket Zaragoza players
Bàsquet Manresa players
Boston Celtics players
Bucaneros de La Guaira players
Suwon KT Sonicboom players
Real Betis Baloncesto players
Gipuzkoa Basket players
Lega Basket Serie A players
Liga ACB players
Maine Red Claws players
Maratonistas de Coamo players
New York Knicks players
Reno Bighorns players
Shanghai Sharks players
Small forwards
Undrafted National Basketball Association players
Wisconsin Badgers men's basketball players
21st-century African-American sportspeople
20th-century African-American people